Aert van Waes, or Aert de Waes ( in Gouda – ), was a Dutch Golden Age painter of the Baroque period.

Biography
He was a student of Wouter Crabeth II, Reinier van Persijn and David Teniers the Younger, and though he lived and worked in Gouda, he travelled in France and Italy to finish his training., According to Houbraken, he learned etching from Reinier van Persijn, and was a good draftsman. He was a friend of Jan Govertsz Verbyl, who he had accompanied on his travels. Houbraken claimed that after their return to Gouda, they both died in 1649 of the same sudden sickness.
The RKD disagrees, and estimates his death between the years 1664–1684.

References

1620s births
1670s deaths
Dutch Golden Age painters
Dutch male painters
People from Gouda, South Holland